The minaret of Jarkurgan is a minaret and architectural monument in the village Minor, Jarqoʻrgʻon District, southern Uzbekistan. It was built by Muhammad bin Ali Al-Sarkhasi in 1108-1109 AD, its current height is 21.6 meters and its diameter is 5.4 meters, its original height was 40 meters. It is located in a small village near Termez and is one of the most interesting forms of architecture, characterized by corrugated walls made of brick. Next to it was a mosque, which has not been preserved. At a height of 20 m, there are brick arches, on which there are Kufic inscriptions.

References

External links
Silk Roads Sites in Uzbekistan, UNESCO World Heritage Centre.

Minarets
Towers in Uzbekistan
Towers completed in the 12th century